Entheus is a Neotropical genus of skippers in the family Hesperiidae, in which it is placed in the tribe Entheini of which it is the type genus.

Species
Entheus aureanota Austin, Mielke & Steinhauser, 1997
Entheus aureolus Austin, Mielke & Steinhauser, 1997
Entheus bombus Austin, Mielke & Steinhauser, 1997
Entheus crux Steinhauser, 1989
Entheus curvus Austin, 1997
Entheus eumelus (Cramer, 1777)
Entheus eunyas Austin, Mielke & Steinhauser, 1997
Entheus gentius (Cramer, 1777)
Entheus huertasae Grishin, 2013
Entheus latebrosus Austin, 1997
Entheus lemna (Butler, 1870)
Entheus matho Godman & Salvin, 1879
Entheus ninyas Druce, 1912
Entheus priassus (Linnaeus, 1758)
Entheus telemus Mabille, 1898
Entheus warreni Grishin, 2012

References

Natural History Museum Lepidoptera genus database
Entheus at funet

Eudaminae
Hesperiidae genera
Hesperiidae of South America
Taxa named by Jacob Hübner